is a Japanese actor and voice actor from Chiba Prefecture, Japan.

Biography

Filmography

Television dramas
 Wataru Seken wa Oni Bakari (Sakurada)

Television animation
Space Battleship Yamato II (1978) (Hyogo Todo)
Space Warrior Baldios (1980)
Lucy of the Southern Rainbow (1982) (Frank Princeton)
Bismark (1985) (Jean-Paul Marcel)
Little Women (1987) (John Brooke)
Patlabor (1989) (Kaihou)
Little Women II: Jo's Boys (1993) (John Brooke)
My Patrasche (1993) (Benois)
Zenki (1995) (Kyoji Goto)
Detective Conan (1996) (Doctor)
Cinderella Monogatari (1996) (Marquess)
Berserk (1998) (Military Officer D, Minister A)
Detective Conan (1998) (Wataru Takanashi)
Master Keaton (1998) (Fumio Hisayama)
Arc the Lad II (1999)
Detective Conan (1999) (Yoshiteru Araide)
Detective Conan (2000) (Kenzo Shiozawa)
Detective Conan (2001) (Kanenari Mochizuki)
Elfen Lied (2004) (Detective A)
Mezzo DSA (2004) (Ando)
Detective Conan (2005) (Senkichi Matsuura)
Cluster Edge (2005)
Monster (2005) (Detective Janda)
Black Lagoon: The Second Barrage (2006) (Vasili Laptev)
Tales of the Abyss (2008) (Sesemann)
Giant Killing (2010) (Kurashige)
Gundam Reconguista in G (2014) (Zucchini)
Psycho-Pass 2 (2014) (Masuda)

OVA
Laughing Target (1987) (Classics teacher)
Legend of the Galactic Heroes (1992) (Asadora Chartian)
Master Keaton (1998) (Harold Smith)

Theatrical animation
Patlabor: The Movie (1989) (Kaihou)
Patlabor 2: The Movie (1993) (Kaihou)
WXIII: Patlabor the Movie 3 (2002) (Kaihou)

Video games
Star Wars Rogue Squadron II: Rogue Leader (2002) (Japanese dub (Jan Dodonna))
God of War (2005) (Japanese dub (Zeus))
Boku no Natsuyasumi (2006) (Vice-principal)
God of War II (2007) (Japanese dub (Zeus))

Dubbing

Live-action
François Berléand
The Transporter (Inspector Tarconi)
Transporter 2 (Inspector Tarconi)
Transporter 3 (Inspector Tarconi)
Le Concert (Olivier Morne Duplessis)
Transporter: The Series (Inspector Tarconi)
Richard Jenkins
Blue Steel (Dawson)
Burn After Reading (Ted Treffon)
Friends with Benefits (Dylan Harper, Sr)
Jack Reacher (Alex Rodin)
Killing Them Softly (Driver)
Tom Wilkinson
Shakespeare in Love (Hugh Fennyman)
The Exorcism of Emily Rose (Father Richard Moore)
The Green Hornet (James Reid)
Mission: Impossible – Ghost Protocol (IMF Secretary)
Unfinished Business (Timothy McWinters)
15 Minutes (Deputy Chief Declan Duffy (James Handy))
The Amazing Spider-Man (Gustav Fiers (Michael Massee))
The Amityville Horror (1982 NTV edition) (Jeff (Michael Sacks))
Annie (Waiter at Domani  (Ray Iannicelli))
The Art of War (Ambassador Wu (James Hong))
Blood Father (Tom 'Preacher' Harris (Michael Parks))
The Brave (Larry (Marshall Bell))
Clear and Present Danger (James Cutter (Harris Yulin))
Con Air (2000 TV Asahi edition) (Devers (John Roselius))
Coneheads (Gorman Seedling (Michael McKean))
The Corruptor (Sean Wallace (Brian Cox))
Daylight (Norman Bassett (Barry Newman))
Die Hard with a Vengeance (1998 Fuji TV edition) (Bill Jarvis (Michael Cristofer))
Escape from L.A. (President (Cliff Robertson))
Fantastic Beasts and Where to Find Them (Gilbert Bingley (Peter Breitmayer))
Fearless Hyena Part II (Ching Chun-nam / Old Chan (James Tien))
The Fountain (Grand Inquisitor Silecio (Stephen McHattie))
Freedom Writers (Steve Gruwell (Scott Glenn))
Frida (Leon Trotsky (Geoffrey Rush))
Friends (season 2 onward) (Jack Geller (Elliott Gould))
Gambit (The Major (Tom Courtenay))
The Goonies (Irving Walsh (Keith Walker))
A Hidden Life (Judge Lueben (Bruno Ganz))
Hill Street Blues (Officer Andy Renko (Charles Haid))
Howard the Duck (1992 TBS edition) (Lieutenant Welker (Paul Guilfoyle))
I Am Sam (Robert (Stanley DeSantis))
In the Mood for Love (Mr. Ho (Kelly Lai Chen))
Jobs (Arthur Rock (J. K. Simmons))
Judge Dredd (Judge Esposito (Peter Marinker))
K-19: The Widowmaker (Dr. Gennadi Savran (Donald Sumpter))
Kramer vs. Kramer (2009 Blu-Ray edition) (Jim O'Connor (George Coe))
L.A. Confidential (Pierce Morehouse Patchett (David Strathairn))
Lethal Weapon (1997 TV Asahi edition) (Michael Hunsaker (Tom Atkins))
Lincoln (William H. Seward (David Strathairn))
Métal Hurlant Chronicles (Kern (Rutger Hauer))
Michel Vaillant (Henri Vaillant (Jean-Pierre Cassel))
Miss March (Hugh Hefner)
A Moment to Remember (Mr. Kim (Park Sang-gyu))
Monsoon Wedding (Lalit Verma (Naseeruddin Shah))
The Monuments Men (President Harry S. Truman (Christian Rodska))
The Natural (Max Mercy (Robert Duvall))
The Negotiator (2001 TV Asahi edition) (Chief Al Travis) (John Spencer))
The NeverEnding Story (Teeny Weeny (Deep Roy), Mr. Bux (Gerald McRaney))
Nowhere Boy (George Toogood Smith (David Threlfall))
Point of No Return (Victor 'The Cleaner' (Harvey Keitel))
The Prestige (John Cutter (Michael Caine))
The Punisher (Dino Moretti (Bryan Marshall))
The Purple Rose of Cairo (Henry (Edward Herrmann))
Red (Alexander Dunning (Richard Dreyfuss))
The Rock (1999 NTV edition) (Lonner (Xander Berkeley))
The Rock (2000 TV Asahi edition) (James Womack (John Spencer))
Screamers (2000 Fuji TV edition) (Secretary Green (Bruce Boa))
Single White Female (Mitchell Myerson (Stephen Tobolowsky))
The Social Network (Gage (David Selby))
Some Kind of Beautiful (Gordon (Malcolm McDowell))
The Sound of Music (50th Anniversary edition) (Franz (Gil Stuart))
Star Trek: The Motion Picture (Leonard McCoy (DeForest Kelley))
Star Wars: Episode I – The Phantom Menace (Mas Amedda (David Bowers))
Star Wars: Episode II – Attack of the Clones (Mas Amedda (David Bowers))
Star Wars: Episode III – Revenge of the Sith (Mas Amedda (David Bowers))
Stealing Cars (Philip Wyatt (William H. Macy))
Time Bandits (1988 TV Asahi edition) (Compere (Jim Broadbent))
True Crime (Alan Mann (James Woods))
Twixt (Bobby LaGrange (Bruce Dern))
Unknown (Ernst Jürgen (Bruno Ganz))
Vegas Vacation (Cousin Eddie Johnson (Randy Quaid))
Virus (J. W. Woods Jr. (Marshall Bell))
Wall Street: Money Never Sleeps (Dr. Masters (Austin Pendleton))
The Young Pope (Cardinal Michael Spencer (James Cromwell))

Animation
The Adventures of Tintin (Allan Thompson)
Batman: The Animated Series (Frederick)
Star Wars: The Clone Wars (Mas Amedda)

References

External links
 

1940 births
Living people
Japanese male video game actors
Japanese male voice actors
Male voice actors from Chiba Prefecture